Ria Tobing (1938–2017) was an Indonesian swimmer. She competed in the women's 200 metre breaststroke at the 1956 Summer Olympics. She was the first woman to represent Indonesia at the Olympics.

References

External links
 

1938 births
2017 deaths
Indonesian female swimmers
Olympic swimmers of Indonesia
Swimmers at the 1956 Summer Olympics
Place of birth missing
Asian Games medalists in swimming
Asian Games bronze medalists for Indonesia
Swimmers at the 1958 Asian Games
Medalists at the 1958 Asian Games
Female breaststroke swimmers
20th-century Indonesian women
21st-century Indonesian women